Dunalka Manor is a manor house with surrounding complex of buildings in , Dunalka Parish, South Kurzeme Municipality, in the historical region of Courland, in western Latvia.

History 
Manor centre includes also ruins of the late medieval Dunalka Old Manor.

See also
List of palaces and manor houses in Latvia

References 

Manor houses in Latvia
South Kurzeme Municipality
Courland